Mitt lille land ("My Little Country") is a 2011 album released by the Norwegian People's Aid and Sony Music as a memorial album for the 2011 Norway attacks. Its name is from the song Mitt lille land by Ole Paus and includes two versions of this song, performed by Maria Mena and Ole Paus. As of October 2011, it was the best-selling music album in Norway.

Track listing

Mitt lille land performed by Maria Mena
Til ungdommen performed by Herborg Kråkevik
Barn av regnbuen performed by Maria Solheim
Eg ser performed by Bjørn Eidsvåg
Kjærlighetsvisa performed by Halvdan Sivertsen
Tyven, tyven performed by Dum Dum Boys
Engler i sneen performed by Jonas Fjeld and Lynni Treekrem
Det fine vi hadd’ sammen performed by DDE
Ei hand å holde i performed by Jørn Hoel
Alt eg såg performed by Sigvart Dagsland
Til dem du e gla o performed by Kråkesølv and Magnus Eliassen
Gje meg handa di, ven performed by Kurt Nilsen and Helene Bøksle
Rose performed by Hanne Krogh
Det hainnle om å leve performed by Kine Hellebust
Vitae Lux performed by Ole Edvard Antonsen
Vårherres klinkekule performed by Haddy N'jie and Kringkastingsorkesteret (live)
Lys og varme performed by Åge Aleksandersen and Kringkastingsorkesteret (live)
Mitt lille land performed by Ole Paus

References

2011 albums
Ole Paus albums
Works about the 2011 Norway attacks